Al-Eiss or Al-Iss  is a Syrian town located in Mount Simeon District, Aleppo.  According to the Syria Central Bureau of Statistics (CBS), Al-Eiss had a population of 4,801 in the 2004 census.

References 

Populated places in Mount Simeon District